Kilger is a surname. Notable people with the surname include:

Bob Kilger (1944–2021), Canadian politician
Chad Kilger (born 1976), Canadian ice hockey player

Surnames from given names